Seventh Day Baptist Missionary Society is a Baptist missionary society that was involved in sending workers to countries such as China as far back as the late Qing dynasty.  It was organized in 1842 by Seventh Day Baptists and is still active in promoting the gospel of Jesus around the world.

Summary
Spreading the Gospel in the United States, Canada, and around the world is the goal of the Seventh Day Baptist Missionary Society.

The Society carries out national and international missions through education, information, and suggestions for tangible assistance. These are stepping stones to becoming a beacon to others around the world.

In Guyana, India, Jamaica, Malawi, the Philippines, and across the globe, the funds and workers of the Missionary Society are ministering. The congregations of the United States and Canada, through their individual members, make up the foundation for our worldwide outreach.

History

Seventh Day Baptists have always been a missionary people. In 1664 Stephen Mumford immigrated to Newport, Rhode Island, and was encouraged in his witness by Seventh Day Baptist (then known as Sabbatarian Baptist) brethren in London, England. It was through his labors that the first Seventh Day Baptist Church was organized in Newport in 1671. AS soon as it became strong enough it sent out the minister to other parts of Rhode Island and Connecticut to preach the gospel and the Sabbath truth. A log meeting house was built in the Hopkinton area of Westerly in 1680, but the First Hopkinton church was not constituted until 1708. In the 1700s the mission work was to visit and preach to the scattered Sabbath-keepers, to nourish, strengthen and build them up.

The General Conference, in its first meeting (1802), was a missionary movement established "that missionaries be sent out, instructed and supported by the General Conference." In 1818 a "Board of Trustees and Directors of Missions" was appointed. In 1821 the Seventh Day Baptist Missionary Magazine began its five-year history. In 1828 a more aggressive and independent society, "the American Seventh Day Baptist Missionary Society," was formed, and the next year the General Board of Missions of Conference turned the responsibilities of missions over to this new society. In 1839 a Hebrew Missionary Society was formed. In 1842 the SDB Missionary Association was started and was merged with the existing society to form the "Seventh Day Baptist Missionary Society."

The home field was primary. But in 1844 interest grew in a foreign mission work. Through the years many fields have been entered. The date of entry and close of work, through missionaries from America, are given. Countries underlined indicate that a continuing national church has developed.

China 1847 - 1950, Palestine 1854 - 1860, England 1896 - 1900, Malawi 1898 - 1914, 1953 - 1990, Ghana 1901, Guyana 1913 - 1930, 1961 - 1974, Jamaica 1923 - 1978, Philippines 1979 - 1985, Finland 1987 - 1990, Mexico 1998 - 2008.

In recent years the concept of mission work has changed. This was due partly in the expense of sending a full-time missionary to a location, supporting them, and then returning them to the States. But, also we have found that the best people to teach a group is one of the group. So, the plan was to send a teacher to instruct the leaders in the polity and beliefs of the Seventh Day Baptists and allow them to pass the information along to the congregations. This worked very effectively. After a couple of visits to the country by the executive director of the Missionary Society an individual would visit them and take a couple of weeks to speak to them about the polity, beliefs, and structure of a Seventh Day Baptist conference. This leader would work with the leaders to formulate a manual of procedure for their conference. This manual would then be published and distributed to the churches so that the leaders could teach the congregation. The expense for this process is much lower and would enable one of the leaders within the country to do the teaching and leading of the conference to a better understanding of the work that is to be done.

Since 1992, God has opened the door to our denomination to many countries and they have entered and succeeded in their ministries. A complete list of them, along with the name of the General Secretary and his e-mail address, can be obtained through a request to the Missionary Society in the USA. However, this should not be mistaken for the list of members held in the Seventh Day Baptist World Federation.

See also
 Protestant missionary societies in China during the 19th Century
Timeline of Chinese history
19th-century Protestant missions in China
List of Protestant missionaries in China
Christianity in China
Seventh Day Baptists

Notes

References

External links 

 Seventh Day Baptist Missionary Society
 Seventh Day Baptist World Federation
 Seventh Day Baptist General Conference of USA and Canada
 Seventh Day Baptist Historical Library and Archives

Baptist missionary societies
Christian missions in China
Seventh Day Baptists
Religious organizations established in 1842